Cleobulo Faría (born 2 March 1901, date of death unknown), known as Soda, was a Brazilian footballer. He played in three matches for the Brazil national football team in 1923. He was also part of Brazil's squad for the 1923 South American Championship.

References

External links
 

1901 births
Year of death missing
Brazilian footballers
Brazil international footballers
Place of birth missing
Association footballers not categorized by position